Emerytka  is a village in the administrative district of Gmina Władysławów, within Turek County, Greater Poland Voivodeship, in west-central Poland.

The village has a population of 176.

References

Emerytka